In January 2015, the Corinthia Hotel in Tripoli was attacked by men affiliated with the Islamic State of Iraq and the Levant (ISIL). The hotel was popular with foreign officials and government workers; it had previously housed the Libyan Prime Minister.

Attack
In the early hours of 27 January 2015, ISIL-affiliated men detonated a car bomb in the parking garage of the hotel. In the chaos, an estimated 5 gunmen stormed past the local guard and entered the hotel, intent on killing guests.

Some of the attackers survived the initial contact, leading to a protracted hostage situation.

Victims

Five foreigners died in the attack: one American, one Frenchman, and three Tajiks (including two women). The American, David Berry, was working as a contractor for an American security firm named Crucible. Five Libyan security personnel are also reported to have died in the attack.

Perpetrators and motivations
The attack was carried out by men belonging to ISIL's "Tripoli Province", who are believed to have been natives of Libya. The attackers' stated objective was revenge for the death of Abu Anas al-Libi, a Libyan Al-Qaeda operative who was involved in the bombing of two American embassies in 1998. He was captured by American forces inside Libya in 2013, and died in an American hospital on 2 January 2015.

See also

 ISIL takeover of Derna

References

Suicide bombings in 2015
ISIL terrorist incidents in Libya
Mass shootings in Africa
21st century in Tripoli, Libya
Crime in Tripoli, Libya
Attacks on hotels in Africa
January 2015 events in Africa
Terrorist incidents in Libya in 2015
2015 murders in Libya
2015 mass shootings in Africa
Mass murder in 2015
Hotel bombings